List of Chief Rabbis of Poland:

 1945–1956 – 
 1956–1957 – Zew Wawa Morejno
 1957–1961 – Ber Percowicz
 1961–1966 –  
 1966–1988 – unfilled
 1988–1999 –  
 1999–2004 – unfilled
 since 2004 – Michael Schudrich

References